"Heart Like Mine" is a song co-written and recorded by American country music artist Miranda Lambert.  It was released in January 2011 as the fifth and final single from her 2009 album Revolution. Lambert co-wrote this song with Ashley Monroe and Travis Howard.

The song garnered positive reviews from critics who praised its catchability and Lambert's lyrics. "Heart Like Mine" gave Lambert her second number one hit on the Billboard Hot Country Songs chart. It also charted on the Hot 100 at number 44. The song was certified Gold by the Recording Industry Association of America (RIAA), denoting sales of over half-a-million units in the country. The song also charted in Canada, peaking at number 69 on the Canadian Hot 100.

The accompanying music video for the song, directed by Justin Luffman, is an acoustic performance taken from Lambert's Revolution: Live by Candlelight DVD.

Content
"Heart Like Mine" is an uptempo country in the key of A major song backed primarily by electric guitar, banjo, and steel guitar. The song's female narrator describes being a little rough around the edges ("I ain’t the kind you take home to mama / I ain’t the kind to wear no ring"). However she ignores the criticism of her family and peers, stating that Jesus would understand a "heart like [hers]."

Critical reception
The song received positive reviews from music critics. C.M. Wilcox of The 9513 gave the song a thumbs up, referring to the single as a safe choice for radio, but favorably describing the lyrics as "uniquely Miranda." Kyle Ward of Roughstock gave the song four-and-a-half stars out of five, complimenting its "exceptionally strong melody" that works well with the song's production. He concluded that the song is a "catchy number [...] made for radio."

Music video
The music video, directed by Justin Luffman, premiered on CMT on January 21, 2011. The video is an acoustic performance of the song, taken from Lambert's Revolution: Live by Candlelight DVD. It also features David Foster

Charts
"Heart Like Mine" debuted at number 58 on the U.S. Billboard Hot Country Songs chart for the week ending January 8, 2011. It also debuted at number 95 on the U.S. Billboard Hot 100 chart for the week of February 26, 2011, and at number 95 on the Canadian Hot 100 chart for the week of April 2, 2011. The song became Lambert's second Number One hit on the Hot Country Songs chart for the week dated May 28, 2011.

Weekly charts

Year-end charts

Decade-end charts

Certifications

Release history

References

2009 songs
2011 singles
Miranda Lambert songs
Columbia Nashville Records singles
Song recordings produced by Frank Liddell
Songs written by Miranda Lambert
Songs written by Ashley Monroe